One Ride in Vegas is the debut studio album by American country music singer Deryl Dodd. It was released in 1996 via Columbia Records. The album includes the singles "Friends Don't Drive Friends…", "That's How I Got to Memphis", and "Movin' Out to the Country".

Critical reception
Don Yates of Country Standard Time gave the album a mixed review, saying that "Friends Don't Drive Friends…" was "one of the finest honky tonk songs of the year" and that Dodd was "impassioned" on "That's How I Got to Memphis", but he criticized the rest of the album for "rely[ing] on lyrical clichés".

Track listing

Personnel
Deryl Dodd- lead vocals, background vocals
Glen Duncan- fiddle
Pat Flynn- acoustic guitar
Sonny Garrish- steel guitar
Owen Hale- drums
David Hungate- bass guitar
Liana Manis- background vocals
Larry Marrs- background vocals
Brent Mason- electric guitar
Steve Nathan- keyboards
Harry Stinson- background vocals
Glenn Worf- bass guitar

Chart performance

References

1996 debut albums
Deryl Dodd albums
Albums produced by Blake Chancey
Columbia Records albums